Thomas Royall Miller (July 5, 1897 – August 13, 1980) was a Major League Baseball player. He played two seasons with the Boston Braves from 1918 to 1919.

References

External links

Boston Braves players
1897 births
1980 suicides
Baseball players from Virginia
Worcester Boosters players
Wichita Falls Spudders players
Richmond Spiders baseball players
Suicides by firearm in Virginia
People from Powhatan County, Virginia